Marcel Chevalier (28 February 1921 in Montrouge, Hauts-de-Seine – 8 October 2008 in Vendôme) worked as the last chief executioner (Monsieur de Paris) in France. He succeeded his wife's uncle, André Obrecht, in 1976 and held his position until 1981, when capital punishment was abolished under president François Mitterrand and justice minister Robert Badinter. The method of application of the death penalty for civil capital offences in France from 1791 to 1981 was beheading with the guillotine. Military executions were by firing squad.

Chevalier, who started his executioner's career in 1958, performed about 40 executions. After his appointment as chief executioner on 1 October 1976, he executed only two people. They were the last two executions in France:
Jérôme Carrein, condemned twice for the murder and rape of an eight-year-old girl, was guillotined on 23 June 1977 in Douai.
Hamida Djandoubi, for having tortured and strangled his former nurse, was guillotined on 10 September 1977 in Marseille.

Chevalier worked as a printer subsequent to his retirement. He was married to Marcelle Obrecht with whom he had two children. His son Éric was present at Carrein's and Djandoubi's executions in order to prepare him for succession to chief executioner upon his father's eventual retirement.

Chevalier was interviewed by the press on a number of occasions, but later, disillusioned by the sensationalist nature of press coverage, chose to say nothing of his experiences with the guillotine.

References

External links 
 Biography (in French)

1921 births
2008 deaths
People from Montrouge
French executioners